Home, and Other Big, Fat Lies is a middle grade novel by Jill Wolfson. It was first published in 2006 by Henry Holt and Company Publishers. It is about a young girl in foster care.

Plot introduction

Whitney has been in so many foster homes that she can give a complete rundown on the most common varieties of foster parents—from the look-on-the-bright-side types to those unfortunate examples of pure evil. But one thing she doesn’t know much about is trees. This means heading for Foster Home #12 (which is all the way at the top of the map of California, where there looks to be nothing but trees) has Whitney feeling a little nervous. She is pretty sure that the middle of nowhere is going to be just one more place where a hyper, loud-mouthed kid who is messy and small for her age won’t be welcome for long.

Reviews
“There is no preaching here, just honest to goodness situational humor perfect for starting a discussion on environmental topics. It might just encourage youth to find ways to stand out while fitting in.” —Voice of Youth Advocates (VOYA) 

“A sweet, spirited tale told with warmth and humor about a determined misfit who finds a home at last in a family and a community.” —Kirkus 

“I would highly recommend this book to anyone who knows someone who is a foster child, someone who loves nature like me or anyone who likes a story about love (in this case love for family and nature)” —Student review, Stone Soup Magazine

“The protagonist's spunky voice will engage readers. Fans of Patricia Reilly Giff's Pictures of Hollis Woods will appreciate Whitney's independence and plucky spirit.” —School Library Journal

Awards and nominations
IRA (International Reading Association) Children's Book Award Notable Book 
Green Earth Book Award Honor Book, Newton Marasco Foundation 
Santa Monica Library Green Award 
Pennsylvania School Librarian Association, Young Reader’s Choice nominee

Reception
Texas Lone Star Reading List Selection 
Kansas State Reading Circle 
New York Public Library 100 Titles for Reading and Sharing

References

2006 American novels
American young adult novels
Works about adoption
Henry Holt and Company books